Owatonna is both a city and a township in Steele County, Minnesota, in the United States:

Owatonna, Minnesota
Owatonna Township, Steele County, Minnesota